Leonhard Ragaz (1868–1945) was a Swiss Reformed theologian and, with Hermann Kutter, one of the founders of religious socialism in Switzerland. He was influenced by Christoph Blumhardt. He was married to the feminist and peace activist Clara Ragaz-Nadig.

Biography 

Born to a farmer family in Tamins, Grisons, on 28 July 1868, Ragaz studied theology in Basel, Jena, and Berlin. In 1890, he was elected as minister in Flerden, Heinzenberg. In 1893, he moved to Chur, working as a teacher of language and religion, and from 1895 to 1902 as municipal minister. In 1902, Ragaz was elected as minister at the Basel Minster.

In Basel, Ragaz came into contact with the labour movement. As construction workers went on strike in 1903, Ragaz delivered a sermon in the minster which came to be known as the "bricklayers' strike sermon", in which he said that "if institutional Christendom were to be cold and incomprehending towards the becoming of a new world, which after all emerged from the heart of the gospel, then the salt of the earth would have become putrid".

In 1908, Ragaz was called to a professorship at the theological faculty of the University of Zurich.
In 1921, he resigned as professor, stating that he could not continue to educate ministers for the bourgeois Swiss Reformed Church.
He and his family moved to the proletarian Aussersihl district of Zurich. He remained involved with the labour movement, editing his journal Neue Wege, until his death in Zurich on 6 December 1945.

Religious socialism and pacifism 
For Ragaz, the Early Church was based on a spirit of cooperation and collectivity.
As a consequence, the socialist ideal of self-administered cooperatives owned by the workers themselves was a postulate directly derived from the gospel and the promise of justice in  God's kingdom.

Also as a consequence of his Christian belief in justice and peace, Ragaz staunchly opposed the First World War, from a stance of active pacifism: he called for all religious socialists to unite in protesting the war.
He taught that if capitalism resorted to force and violence, that was a true reflection of its nature, but that if socialism did the same, it was a treason to its ideals.

Ragaz' main work is  Die Bibel – eine Deutung ("The Bible - An Interpretation"), written during the Second World War and published in seven volumes in 1947–1950.

Works 
Du sollst. Grundzüge einer sittlichen Weltanschauung, Waetzel, Freiburg im Breisgau 1904
Dein Reich komme. Predigten, Helbing & Lichtenhahn, Basel 1909
Religionsphilosophie, 2 vols., Zürich 1909
Die neue Schweiz. Ein Programm für Schweizer und solche, die es werden wollen, 
Weltreich, Religion und Gottesherrschaft, 2 vols., Rotapfel, Zürich/Leipzig 1922
Der Kampf um das Reich Gottes in Blumhardt, Vater und Sohn – und weiter!, Rotapfel, Zürich/Leipzig 1922
Von Christus zu Marx – von Marx zu Christus. Ein Beitrag, Harder, Wernigerode 1929
Das Reich und die Nachfolge. Andachten, Herbert Lang, Bern 1937
Gedanken. Aus vierzig Jahren geistigen Kampfes (anthology), Herbert Lang, Bern 1938
Die Botschaft vom Reiche Gottes. Ein Katechismus für Erwachsene, Herbert Lang, Bern 1942
Die Gleichnisse Jesu, Herbert Lang, Bern 1944
Die Bergpredigt Jesu, Herbert Lang, Bern 1945
Die Geschichte der Sache Christi. Ein Versuch, Herbert Lang, Bern 1945
Die Bibel. Eine Deutung, 7 vols., Diana, Zürich 1947–50
Mein Weg. Eine Autobiographie, autobiography, 2 vols., Diana, Zürich 1952
Eingriffe ins Zeitgeschehen. Reich Gottes und Politik. Texte von 1900 bis 1945, eds. Ruedi Brassel and Willy Spieler, Exodus, Luzern 1995, 
Leonhard Ragaz in seinen Briefen, eds. Christine Ragaz et al. (letters): 
vol. 1: 1887–1914, Zürich 1966, 
vol. 2: 1914–1932, Zürich 1982, 
vol. 3: 1933–1945, Zürich 1992,

References

Further reading 
Böhm, Manfred: Gottes Reich und Gesellschaftsveränderung. Traditionen einer befreienden Theologie im Spätwerk von Leonhard Ragaz, ed. Liberación, Münster 1988
Buess, Eduard / Mattmüller, Markus: Prophetischer Sozialismus. Blumhardt – Ragaz – Barth, Exodus, Fribourg 1986
Herkenrath, Silvia: Politik und Gottesreich. Kommentare zur Weltpolitik des Jahre 1918–1945 von Leonhard Ragaz, TVZ, Zürich 1977
Jäger, Hans Ulrich: Ethik und Eschatologie bei Leonhard Ragaz. Versuch einer Darstellung der Grundstrukturen und inneren Systematik von Leonhard Ragaz' theologischem Denken unter besonderer Berücksichtigung seiner Vorlesungsmanuskripte, TVZ, Zürich 1971
Kern, Karl Hans: Leonhard Ragaz – Dennoch glauben, Pahl-Rugenstein, 1996, 
Kim, Hee-Eun: Das Verhältnis zwischen Christentum und Marxismus-Leninismus bei Leonhard Ragaz in seiner Bedeutung für die Minjung-Theologie, Haag + Herchen, 1991, 
Köpke, Wilfried: "Wir harren eines neuen Himmels und einer neuen Erde" - Geschichtstheologische Grundlinien im Werk der Krise von Leonhard Ragaz, München 2007, 
Lietha, Walter (ed.): Leonhard Ragaz im Profil. Gedanken – Biographisches – Lebenszeugnisse, Calven, Chur 1995, 
Lindt, Andreas: Leonhard Ragaz. Eine Studie zur Geschichte und Theologie des religiösen Sozialismus, Evangelischer Verlag, Zollikon 1957
Mattmüller, Markus: Leonhard Ragaz und der religiöse Sozialismus. Eine Biographie, 2 vols., EVZ, Zollikon/Zürich 1957/1968
Rostig, Dittmar: Bergpredigt und Politik. Zur Struktur und Funktion des Reiches Gottes bei Leonhard Ragaz, Peter Lang, Frankfurt am Main/Bern 1991
Ryoo, Jang-Hyun: Reich Gottes und seine Gerechtigkeit für die Erde. Das Verständnis von Reich Gottes und Sozialismus bei Leonhard Ragaz in seiner Bedeutung für die christlich-sozialistische Bewegung in Südkorea, diss. Berlin 1997
Stähli, Martin Johann: Reich Gottes und Revolution. Christliche Theorie und Praxis für die Armen dieser Welt. Die Theologie des Religiösen Sozialismus bei Leonhard Ragaz und die Theologie der Revolution in Lateinamerika, Reich (= Theologische Forschung 57), Hamburg-Bergstedt 1976
Ulrich von den Steinen: Agitation für das Reich Gottes. Ein Beitrag zur religiös-sozialen Predigtpraxis und homiletischen Theorie bei Leonhard Ragaz, Kaiser (= Beiträge zur evangelischen Theologie 77), München 1977
 Wieland Zademach (ed.): Reich Gottes für diese Welt – Theologie gegen den Strich. Erbe der Väter (L. Ragaz/M. Buber/H. J. Iwand/J. L. Hromadka/H. Gollwitzer/P. Teilhard de Chardin). Auftrag für heute – Hoffnung für morgen, Spenner, Waltrop 2001,

External links 

 
 Neue Wege biography page

1868 births
1945 deaths
20th-century Calvinist and Reformed theologians
Calvinist and Reformed Christian socialists
Calvinist pacifists
Christian socialist theologians
People from Imboden District
Social Democratic Party of Switzerland politicians
Swiss Calvinist and Reformed ministers
Swiss Calvinist and Reformed theologians
Swiss Christian socialists
Systematic theologians